Georges Malissard (3 October 1877 – 13 April 1942) was a French sculptor. His work was part of the sculpture event in the art competition at the 1932 Summer Olympics.

References

1877 births
1942 deaths
20th-century French sculptors
French male sculptors
Olympic competitors in art competitions
People from Nord (French department)